Tai To Yan is a mountain that lies in northern Hong Kong near Fanling. It is close to a similarly named peak called Pak Tai To Yan.

Geography 
Tai To Yan is 566 metres tall and is the tallest mountain in the nearby area.

Access 
Tai To Yan is in the Lam Tsuen Country Park in northern Hong Kong. It is hiked as part of the Razors Edge Ridge Hike which brings hikers to both Tai To Yan (566 m) and nearby Pak Tai To Yan (480 m). Hikers can start their hike near Kadoorie Farm and finish a few hours later at Fanling MTR station or Wah Ming Estate Bus Terminus.

See also 
 List of mountains, peaks and hills in Hong Kong
 Lam Tsuen Country Park

References